Nymphicula bombayensis is a Crambidae species in the genus Nymphicula. It was described by Charles Swinhoe and Everard Charles Cotes in 1889. It is found in India.

References

Moths described in 1889
Nymphicula